Hermann Giliomee is an author of historical and political studies, former Professor of Political Studies at the University of Cape Town (1983–2002), President of the South African Institute of Race Relations (1995–1997) and Extraordinary Professor of History at the Stellenbosch University.

He co-founded Die Suid-Afrikaans, an Afrikaans journal of opinion in 1984. Giliomee was a regular columnist for the Cape Times, The Rand Daily Mail and other periodicals from 1980 to 1997 and is writing a political column for the Afrikaans morning newspapers Die Burger, Beeld and Volksblad.

Books by Hermann Giliomee 
 Ethnic power mobilized – Can South Africa change ? (Co-author: Heribert Adam), Yale University Press, 1979
 Die Kaap tydens die eerste Britse bewind, 1795–1803, 1971
 The parting of the ways, 1982
 Up against the fences, 1985
 The Shaping of South African Society 1652–1840, 1988
 From apartheid to nation-building, 1989
 Negotiating South Africa's future, 1989
 The Bold experiment, 1994
 The awkward embrace, 1999
 Kruispad, 2001
 The Afrikaners: biography of a people, 2003, University of Virginia Press / Tafelberg Publishers; expanded and updated edition, 2010, 
 Die Afrikaners: `n Biografie, 2004
  'n Vaste plek vir Afrikaans (Co-author: Lawrence Schlemmer), Protea Boekhuis, 2006
 Nog altyd hier gewees – Die storie van 'n Stellenbosse gemeenskap, Tafelberg, 2007
 New History of South Africa, both Co-editor: Bernard Mbenga, 2007,  464 pp, 600 illustrations Nuwe geskiedenis van Suid-Afrika,

References

1938 births
Living people
People from Enoch Mgijima Local Municipality
Afrikaner people
South African journalists
Academic staff of the University of Cape Town
Academic staff of Stellenbosch University